The Pillar of Madagascar (Malagasy: andri-Madagasikara; abbreviated AIM) is a political party in Madagascar, led by Andry Rakotovao. In the 2013 general election, the party won 2 seats.

References 

Political parties in Madagascar